Lieutenant General Withers Alexander Burress (November 24, 1894 – June 13, 1977) was United States Army officer who was a graduate and commandant of the Virginia Military Institute as well as a combat commander in World War I and World War II.

Early life and military career
Burress was born in Richmond, Virginia, on November 24, 1894, to John Woodfin Burress and Susan Chinn Withers, the latter a collateral descendant of Sir Walter Scott. He attended and graduated from the Virginia Military Institute (VMI) in 1914. On November 30, 1916, he was commissioned a second lieutenant into the Infantry Branch of the United States Army. The American entry into World War I on April 6, 1917, saw him posted to the 23rd Infantry Regiment, which later became part of the newly created 2nd Infantry Division.

Burress saw combat on the Western Front with the regiment as a regimental operations officer, serving in nearly all of the division's major engagements. On November 2, 1919, a year after the war ended on November 11, 1918, he returned to the United States with the permanent rank of captain.

Between the wars
Burress attended the United States Army Infantry School at Fort Benning, Georgia, the United States Army Command and General Staff School at Fort Leavenworth, Kansas, and the United States Army War College at Washington Barracks in Washington, D.C.

From 1935 to 1940, Burress was a professor of military science and served as commandant of the Virginia Military Institute. In 1940, he was assigned to the War Department General Staff in Washington, D.C.

World War II
In 1941, with the United States entrance into World War II, Burress had returned to Fort Benning as Assistant Commandant of the United States Army Infantry School. In early 1942, he was assigned to the Puerto Rican Department. He was given command of the 100th Infantry Division upon its mobilization at Fort Jackson, South Carolina, in November 1942.

Burress continued in his command, taking the division to France in October 1944. As part of the Seventh United States Army's VI Corps, the division went into combat in the Vosges Mountains of northeastern France then through the Rhineland, Ardennes, and Central European campaigns until November 1945, making Burress one of eleven generals to command one of the United States Army's 90 divisions from mobilization to the end of the war. On September 22, 1945, he was promoted to command of the VI Corps then served as Inspector General for European Command (EURCOM).

Postwar
In May 1947, Burress was one of three commanders of the United States Constabulary, the post-war occupation police force in West Germany. In 1949, he returned to EURCOM as its intelligence director, then later took command of VII Corps. He then was the Commandant of the United States Army Infantry School.

In 1952, Burress's final posting was as commander of the First United States Army at Fort Jay at Governors Island in New York City, New York. In November 1954, he retired from the United States Army after 38 years of active duty. That same month, on November 19, 1954, he received a ticker-tape parade down the Canyon of Heroes on Broadway in Manhattan, New York.

Burress died in an Arlington, Virginia nursing home on June 13, 1977, aged 82, and is buried in Arlington National Cemetery.

References

Sources

External links
Story of the Century The 100th Division
 Coldwar.org U.S. Constabulary, 1946–1952
Downtown Alliance Commemorates 204 Canyon of Heroes Parades
Generals of World War II
United States Army Officers 1939–1945

|-

|-

|-

|-

|-

1894 births
1977 deaths
United States Army Infantry Branch personnel
United States Army personnel of World War I
Governors Island
Military personnel from Richmond, Virginia
People from Richmond, Virginia
Recipients of the Distinguished Service Medal (US Army)
Recipients of the Legion of Merit
Virginia Military Institute alumni
United States Army Command and General Staff College alumni
Recipients of the Silver Star
United States Army generals of World War II
United States Army generals
Virginia Military Institute faculty